Good Conduct Medal may refer to:

Good Conduct Medal (Ireland), a military decoration of the Defence Forces of Ireland
Good Conduct Medal (United States), a military decoration of the United States Armed Forces
Good Conduct Medal (Vietnam), a military decoration of South Vietnam 1964–1974

See also
Reserve Good Conduct Medal, a military decoration of the United States Armed Forces
Long Service and Good Conduct Medal, a similar decoration used in several Commonwealth states